Kelsie Payne (born 29 November 1995) is an American volleyball player who has played in Brazil, Switzerland and South Korea. Payne attended the University of Kansas from 2014-2018 where she garnered the title of All-Time Kills Leader. Payne was also a 3 time All-American and Big 12 Player of The Year (2016). During her time at KU Payne led her team to a big 12 championship and a final four appearance.

She currently plays for SigortaShop in the Turkish Volleyball League.

References

External links
  at Volleybox

1995 births
Living people
American women's volleyball players
21st-century American women
Kansas Jayhawks women's volleyball players